Oliver Edward Burford (born 23 July 1980) is an English cricketer.  Burfield is a right-handed batsman who fields as a wicket-keeper.  He was born in Lincoln, Lincolnshire.

Burford made his debut for Lincolnshire in the 1999 Minor Counties Championship against Cambridgeshire.  Burford has played Minor counties cricket for Lincolnshire from 1999 to present, which included 65 Minor Counties Championship matches and 39 MCCA Knockout Trophy matches.   He made his List A debut against Suffolk in the 2001 Cheltenham & Gloucester Trophy.  He played 7 further List A matches for Lincolnshire, the last coming against Glamorgan in the 2004 Cheltenham & Gloucester Trophy.  In his 8 matches, he scored 123 runs at an average of 20.50.  He scored a half century against the Surrey Cricket Board in the 2002 Cheltenham & Gloucester Trophy.  Behind the stumps, Burford took 5 catches and made a single stumping.

He has previously played Second XI cricket for the Nottinghamshire and Gloucestershire Second XI's.

References

External links
Oliver Burford at ESPNcricinfo
Oliver Burford at CricketArchive

1980 births
Living people
Cricketers from Lincoln, England
English cricketers
Lincolnshire cricketers
Wicket-keepers